Julsundet is a  long strait connecting the Norwegian Sea to the Romsdalsfjorden. The strait runs through the municipalities of Fræna, Aukra, Molde, and Midsund. The strait flows north-south from the village of Bud (in Fræna Municipality) to Julneset (in Molde Municipality). It flows between the Romsdal peninsula (on the east side) and the islands of Otrøya and Gossa (on the west side). The Frænfjorden empties into the Julsundet strait at the small island of Vågøya.

It has a significant tidal current and is exposed to strong northerly winds. Julsundet was heavily fortified by the Germans during World War II.

The mainland part of Aukra Municipality is also often referred to as Julsundet.

References

Straits of Norway
Landforms of Møre og Romsdal